Blessed Sacrament Church or Blessed Sacrament Catholic Church may refer to:

Canada
Blessed Sacrament Catholic Church (Ottawa)

Singapore
Blessed Sacrament Church, Commonwealth, Singapore

United States
Blessed Sacrament Catholic Church, Hollywood, California
Blessed Sacrament Church (Bridgeport, Connecticut)
Blessed Sacrament Church (New Rochelle, New York)
Blessed Sacrament Church (Seattle), Washington

See also
Cathedral of the Blessed Sacrament (disambiguation)